Diving has been a sport of  the Pan American Games since the 1951 edition.

Events

Medal table

Medalists

References

 
Sports at the Pan American Games
Pan American Games